Substantive procedures (or substantive tests) are those activities performed by the auditor to detect material misstatement or fraud at the assertion level. 

The different assertions of balances are:
 existence, 
 rights and obligations, 
 validity, and 
 completeness.  

Those for transactions are:
 occurrence 
 completeness, 
 accuracy,
 authorization, 
 cut-off, and 
 classification.

Management implicitly assert that account balances and underlying classes of transaction do not contain any material misstatements: in other words, that they are materially complete, valid and accurate. Auditors gather evidence about these assertions by undertaking activities referred to as substantive procedures.

Examples
For example, an auditor may: 
physically examine inventory as evidence that inventory shown in the accounting records actually exists (existence assertion);
inspect supporting documents like invoices to confirm that sales did occur (occurrence); 
arrange for suppliers to confirm in writing the details of the amount owing at balance date as evidence that accounts payable is a liability (rights and obligation assertion); and 
make inquires of management about the collectibility of customers' accounts as evidence that trade debtors are accurate as to its valuation. 
Evidence that an account balance or class of transaction is not complete, valid or accurate is evidence of a substantive misstatement but only becomes a material misstatement when it is large enough that it can be expected to influence the decisions of the users of the financial statement.

Types of procedures
There are two categories of substantive procedures - analytical procedures and tests of detail. Analytical procedures generally provide less reliable evidence than the tests of detail. Analytical procedures are applied in several different audit stages, whereas tests of detail are only applied in the substantive testing stage.

References

Auditing terms